George Winter (27 February 1908 – 10 May 1972) was  a former Australian rules footballer who played with Footscray in the Victorian Football League (VFL).

References

External links 
		

1908 births
1972 deaths
Australian rules footballers from Victoria (Australia)
Western Bulldogs players